Nicole E. Lowen is an American politician and a Democratic member of the Hawaii House of Representatives since January 16, 2013 representing District 6.

Early life and education
Lowen was born in Washington, D.C. and earned her bachelor's degree in United States history from the University of Pennsylvania and her master's degree in urban and regional planning from the University of Hawaii.

Elections
2012 With Democratic Representative Denny Coffman redistricted to District 5, Lowen won the four-way District 6 August 11, 2012 Democratic Primary by 45 votes with 1,067 votes (30.2%), and won the November 6, 2012 General election with 5,336 votes (63.9%) against Republican nominee Roy Ebert.

References

External links
Official page at the Hawaii State Legislature
Campaign site
 

Politicians from Washington, D.C.
Year of birth missing (living people)
Living people
Democratic Party members of the Hawaii House of Representatives
University of Hawaiʻi at Mānoa alumni
University of Pennsylvania alumni
Women state legislators in Hawaii
21st-century American politicians
21st-century American women politicians
American people of Jewish descent
American people of Croatian descent
American people of English descent
American people of German descent